Cotoneaster lucidus, the shiny cotoneaster, or hedge cotoneaster, is a deciduous, medium-sized shrub with long, spreading branches reaching heights (and breadths) of 6' to 10'. It is native to parts of northern Asia, and adapted to tolerate colder weather
(to zone 4). C. lucidus was described in 1856 by Diederich Franz Leonhard von Schlechtendal. Some authorities consider it to be a synonym of Cotoneaster acutifolius, the Peking cotoneaster.

Identification

Leaves and branches
The leaves of Cotoneaster lucidus are dark green (changing yellow to red in autumn), simple, ovate, about 1" to 2.5" long and up to 1" wide, having pubescence on their undersides and growing in an alternate pattern along its stems. Branches are tolerant of pruning.

Flowers
Flowers are a pale-pink, small and clustered blooming in early June. Flower buds are imbricate, appressed with loose exposed outer scales.

Fruit
C lucidus grows an attractive, blackish pome fruit, about half an inch in diameter which ripens between September and October.

Bark
The bark is tan in color, with lenticels on slender stems which have a pattern resembling fishbone.

Roots
Despite its sparse root system, Cotoneaster lucidus holds up well in persistent winds thus making it a good hedging plant. It grows particularly well in well-drained, loose soil, but soil pH can vary.

Propagation
Cotoneaster lucidus can be propagated by cuttings or by seed, with stratification necessary in the case of the latter.

Pests
Cotoneaster lucidus is prone to fireblight, leaf spot, scale insects and spider mites.

References

lucidus
Plants described in 1856